Handen i fickan fast jag bryr mig  (English: Hand in My Pocket Although I Care) is the fourth studio album released by Swedish singer and songwriter Veronica Maggio. The album was released in Sweden on 4 October 2013 through Universal Music AB. The album peaked at number two in Norway and number one in Sweden. The album was produced by Salem Al Fakir, Vincent Pontare and Magnus Lidehäll.

Singles
 "Sergels torg" was released as the lead single from the album on 20 August 2013. The song peaked at number six on the Swedish Singles Chart.

Track listing

Charts

Weekly charts

Year-end charts

Release history

References

2013 albums
Universal Music AB albums
Veronica Maggio albums